Alabama Song is the debut album by singer-songwriter Allison Moorer. The first single from the album, "A Soft Place to Fall", was featured in the Robert Redford film The Horse Whisperer, and was nominated for an Oscar for Best Original Song at the 1999 Academy Awards.

Track listing

Personnel

 Richard Bennett – acoustic guitar, electric guitar, hi-string acoustic guitar
 Ashley Cleveland – background vocals
 John Cowan – background vocals
 Chad Cromwell – drums
 Eric Darken – percussion, tambourine
 Richard Dodd – programming, sampling
 Dan Dugmore – dobro, pedal steel guitar
 Kenny Greenberg – acoustic guitar, electric guitar, gut string guitar
 Glen Hardin – string arrangements, conductor
 Tim Lauer – harmonica, harmonium, Hammond organ
 Larry Marrs – bass guitar, background vocals
 Buddy Miller – background vocals
 Allison Moorer – lead vocals
 Greg Morrow – drums
 The Nashville String Machine – strings
 Louis Dean Nunley – background vocals
 Rick Plant – banjo, acoustic guitar, electric guitar
 Dave Pomeroy – bass guitar
 Louise Red – background vocals
 Michael Rhodes – bass guitar, tic tac bass
 John Wesley Ryles – background vocals
 Joe Spivey – fiddle, acoustic guitar
 Harry Stinson – drums, percussion, background vocals
 Russ Taff – background vocals
 Dennis Wilson – background vocals
 Glenn Worf – upright bass

Chart performance

References

1998 debut albums
MCA Records albums
Allison Moorer albums
Albums produced by Kenny Greenberg